Football Club Vendenheim Alsace is a French football club from Vendenheim founded in 1927. It is best known for its women's team, created in 1974. It was one of the sixteen founding members of the French Championship that same year, and it currently plays in the French Second Division after attaining in 2011 its third promotion since 2004.

2019–20 squad

Competition record

References

Women's football clubs in France
Association football clubs established in 1974
1974 establishments in France
Sport in Bas-Rhin
Division 1 Féminine clubs
Football clubs in Grand Est